Guido Lorraine (2 September 1912 – 31 December 2009) was a Polish-born actor, musician and singer, known primarily for his roles in war films. He was also sometimes known by the stage name Guy Borucki. Lorraine appeared in twenty-eight films during his career, as well as many theatre productions.

Lorraine was born Gwidon Alfred Gottlieb in present-day Kraków, Poland in 1912. He studied at the School of Foreign Trade in Lwów (Lviv), where he sang in restaurants to earn money. He learned to play the accordion and piano as a child.

Lorraine founded a military theatre group during World War II. He is credited as the first singer to perform the song, "Red Poppy Flowers of Monte Cassino", in public.

He adopted the pseudonym Guy Borucki after World War II and moved to London. He appeared on BBC radio, television and film. His film credits during the era included Hotel Sahara in 1951, 1955's The Colditz Story and Blue Murder at St Trinian's in 1957. He also starred in a number of musical comedies and other British productions during the 1950s.

He arrived in Australia in 1959 with the performance of a musical operetta Grab Me a Gondola in which he had the main role, and made his home in Melbourne to pursue his acting career. Much of his career centred on entertainment for the Polish community living in Australia, including a series of theatre performances, revues and cabarets. He also starred in his own television show in 1960 called Tea for Two, a musical programme on Melbourne station HSV-7.

Guido Lorraine died in Melbourne, Australia, on 31 December 2009, at the age of 97.

Filmography

References

External links
 The Telegraph: Lives Remembered - Guido Lorraine
 
 

1912 births
2009 deaths
British male film actors
British male stage actors
Australian male stage actors
Polish male stage actors
Polish male film actors
Male actors from Melbourne
Male actors from London
Male actors from Kraków
Actors from Lviv
Polish emigrants to Australia
Polish emigrants to the United Kingdom
Musicians from London
Musicians from Melbourne
20th-century Australian musicians
20th-century English musicians
Knights of the Order of Merit of the Republic of Poland
Polish military personnel of World War II